"Taffy" is a song written and sung by Lisa Loeb. The song was recorded in 1995. It is featured on her album Tails, and her 2006 greatest hits album, The Very Best of Lisa Loeb.  

The lyrics are addressed to a person who is habitually dishonest in dealing with others, with the line "Sometimes you tell the truth like you're pulling taffy" serving as an accusation of stretching the truth.

Although the song was not a very successful single, it was moderately successful on radio. It peaked at #6 on U.S Billboard Bubbling Under The Hot 100 in early 1996, and the single's video was popular on VH1 and MTV. The song charted in the New Zealand RIANZ Top 40 at #39, #96 on the Australian singles chart and #61 in Canada.

Charts

References

1995 songs
1995 singles
Lisa Loeb songs
Songs written by Lisa Loeb
Geffen Records singles